The  University of Michigan Athletic Hall of Honor, founded in 1978, recognizes University of Michigan athletes, coaches, and administrators who have made significant contributions to the university's athletic programs. To qualify for induction into the Hall of Honor, an individual must have been an All-American, set an NCAA, U.S., or world record, won an NCAA title, or made significant contributions to the university's athletic department as a coach or administrator. The nomination and selection process is conducted by the Letterwinners M Club executive board.

Hall of Honor firsts
The first group inducted into the Hall of Honor in 1978 was Gerald R. Ford, Bill Freehan, Tom Harmon, Ron Kramer, Bennie Oosterbaan, Cazzie Russell, and Bob Ufer.  The second induction class in 1979 consisted of Fritz Crisler, DeHart Hubbard, Ray Fisher, Charlie Fonville, Willie Heston, Chuck Kocsis, George Sisler, Germany Schulz, Rudy Tomjanovich and Fielding H. Yost.

The first women inducted into the Hall of Honor were Olympic diving gold medalist Micki King in 1986 and athletic administrator Marie Hartwig in 1989.  The first African-American athletes inducted were Cazzie Russell (1978), Charlie Fonville (1979) and DeHart Hubbard (1979).

The first players inducted by sport are:
 Baseball – Bill Freehan (1978) and George Sisler (1979)
 Men's Basketball – Cazzie Russell (1978) and Rudy Tomjanovich (1979)
 Women's Basketball – Diane Dietz
 Cross country – Sue Foster (2004) and Melanie Weaver-Barnett  (2007)
 Diving (men's) – Richard Degener (1980) and Dick Kimball (1985)
 Diving (women's) – Micki King (1986) and Chris Seufert-Sholtis (2007)
 Field hockey – Mary (Callam) Brandes (2006)
 Football – Gerald R. Ford, Tom Harmon and Ron Kramer (1978)
 Golf – Chuck Kocsis (1979) and Johnny Fischer (1980)
 Gymnastics (men's) – Newt Loken (coach, 1981) and Ed Gagnier (1992)
 Gymnastics (women's) – Beth Wymer
 Ice hockey – Vic Heyliger (1980) and John Sherf (1981)
 Softball – Penny Neer (2002) and Vicki Morrow (2004)
 Swimming (men's) – Matt Mann (coach, 1980) and Harry Holiday (1981)
 Swimming (women's) – Melinda (Copp) Harrison (2006) and Ann Colloton (2007)
 Synchronised swimming – Ruth Pickett Thompson (2008)
 Tennis – Barry MacKay (1980) and William Murphy (coach, 1983)
 Track & field (men's) – Bob Ufer (1978), DeHart Hubbard (1979) and Charlie Fonville (1979)
 Track & field (women's) – Francie Kraker Goodridge (1994)
 Volleyball – Diane Ratnik (2009)
 Wrestling – Cliff Keen (coach, 1980) and Ed Don George (1981)

Sortable list of inductees 
For alphabetical listing of inductees, see footnote
For listing of inductees by induction year, see footnote

See also
Michigan Wolverines

References

External links
 University of Michigan Hall of Honor. GoBlue (University of Michigan Athletics official website)
 Michigan Athletic Hall of Honor. Bentley Historical Library (archives of the University of Michigan and the Michigan Athletic Department) website

Michigan
Hall of Honor
Awards established in 1978
Halls of fame in Michigan
1978 establishments in Michigan